Chibinda or Tchibinda can refer to:

Tchibinda, a lake in Conkouati-Douli National Park in the Republic of the Congo
Chibinda or Tchibinda, a common surname in western Central Africa
Chibinda or Tchibinda, an alternate name for the Ibinda language of Cabinda, Angola

See also
Tshibinda
Tshibinda Ilunga